Josef Janíček (born 28 December 1947 in Prague, Czechoslovakia, now Czech Republic) is a Czech rock keyboardist, singer, accordion and guitar player. He was a former guitarist of The Primitives Group; from 1969 he played with The Plastic People of the Universe. He was also a member of Milan Hlavsa's band called Půlnoc. Since 1990, he is a member of The Velvet Underground Revival Band.

Discography

With The Plastic People of the Universe
Bez ohňů je underground (1992) - live album
For Kosovo (1997) - live album
The Plastic People of the Universe (1997) - live album
Hovězí porážka (released: 1997, recorded: 1983-84)
Jak bude po smrti (released: 1998, recorded: 1979)
Pašijové hry velikonoční (released: 1998, recorded: 1978)
Vožralej jak slíva (released: 1997, recorded: 1973-1975) - live album
Ach to státu hanobení (released: 2000, recorded: 1976-77)
Líně s tebou spím | Lazy Love / In Memoriam Mejla Hlavsa (2001)
Egon Bondy’s Happy Hearts Club Banned (released: 2001, recorded: 1974-75)
Muž bez uší (released: 2002, recorded 1969-72) - live album
Co znamená vésti koně (released: 2002, recorded: 1981)
Do lesíčka na čekanou (released: 2006, recorded? 1973) - live album
Maska za maskou (2009)
Non Stop Opera (2011) - live album

With Půlnoc
Live Bratislava (1988)
Půlnoc (1990)
City of Hysteria (1991)
Live in New York (1996) - live album

References

1947 births
Living people
Czech accordionists
Czech guitarists
Male guitarists
Czech keyboardists
The Plastic People of the Universe members
21st-century accordionists